Mehmaan could refer to:

 Mehmaan (film), 1973 Indian film
 Mehmaan khana, guest house
 Sarkari Mehmaan, 1979 Indian film